Sheikh Fazle Fahim is a Bangladeshi business leader. He is the president of Federation of Bangladesh Chambers of Commerce and Industries (FBCCI). He served as the 22nd president of FBCCI.

Early life and education 
Fahim is son of Sheikh Fazlul Karim Selim, presidium member of Bangladesh Awami League. He completed Masters of Liberal Arts in political economy from St. Edwards University.

Personal life
Sheikh Fahim is married to Nancy Zahara Bintt Moosa, the daughter of Moosa Bin Shamsher, with whom he has three children, Sheikh Zaharat Maanha, Sheikh Fardan Yavand and Sheikh Farzaad Zaidan.

Career 
Sheikh Fahim is currently the managing director of Obsidian Bangladesh Ltd. He is also the Chairman of Euro Petro Product Ltd. Earlier he worked as the financial adviser at the Edward Jones Investments, a global financial organisation. He was an elected Senior Vice President for the term 2017-2019 of the FBCCI. Earlier he served as an elected Director of FBCCI for the term 2015–2017. He represents Bangladesh as elected Vice President of Confederation of Asia Pacific Chamber of Commerce and Industries, South Asian Association of Regional Cooperation (SAARC) Chamber of Commerce and Industries (SCCI) of private sector of eight South Asian countries. He is now the chairman of IORBF and  D-8 Organization for Economic Cooperation.

Awards
 Certificate of merit, World Customs Organization
 International Construction Business award, Global Trade Leaders Club

References 

Living people
Year of birth missing (living people)
People from Dhaka
St. Edward's University alumni
Sheikh Mujibur Rahman family
21st-century Bengalis